Sugar is the second studio album by German DJ and record producer Robin Schulz, it was released on 25 September 2015. The album includes the singles "Headlights", "Sugar", "Show Me Love", and "Heatwave".

Singles
 "Headlights" was released as the first single from the album on 3 April 2015. The song features vocals from Ilsey and reached a peak of number two in Australia and Austria. It also charted in Belgium, Denmark, Finland, France, Germany, Hungary, Ireland, Italy, the Netherlands, Norway, Poland, Sweden and Switzerland.
 "Sugar" was released as the second single from the album in July 2015. The song features vocals from Canadian recording artist Francesco Yates and samples Baby Bash's 2003 single "Suga Suga".

Track listing

Charts and certifications

Weekly charts

Year-end charts

Certifications

Release history

References

2015 albums
Robin Schulz albums